Ghoradongri railway station is a railway station in Ghoradongri town of Madhya Pradesh. Its code is GDYA. It serves Ghoradongri town. The station consists of three platforms. Passenger, Express and Superfast trains halt here.

Gallery

References

Railway stations in Betul district
Nagpur CR railway division